Clusia alata is a species of flowering plant in the family Clusiaceae. Leaves are distinctly obovate. Flowers are cream colored and 5-petaled. 
 
Found in Ecuador, Colombia, Peru, and Venezuela, generally at elevations between 2000 and 2500 m.

Notes

alata
Trees of Peru